"I Don't Wanna Be Lonely" is the eighteenth single by Dutch girl group Luv', released in early 1990 by the labels Dureco/High Fashion Music. It appears on the EP For You, featuring a formation different from the original line-up.

Song history
After the release of the 1989 single "Welcome to My Party", which marked Luv's comeback, the next single taken from the 1989 EP For You was "I Don't Wanna Be Lonely", a cover version of a 1989 club hit by Joan Orleans. The music arrangements of this song were inspired by those of the hits released by PWL, the British leading dance label in the late 1980s.

Songs about loneliness
1990 singles
1989 songs
Luv' songs
Dance-pop songs